Mateanong is a community council located in the Mokhotlong District of Lesotho. Its population in 2006 was 7,387.

Villages
The community of Mateanong includes the villages of Boelang, Ha Jorose, Ha Leutsoa, Ha Malapane, Ha Maseru, Ha Mohale, Ha Pela, Kholokoe, Khomo-Khoana, Khutlo-Peli, Koeneng, Lentsoeteng, Letšeng, Linotšing, Liphocheng, Liqobong, Makoabating, Malefiloane, Manganeng, Mateanong, Matebeleng, Matlaong, Mechalleng, Meeling, Moeaneng, Mohlanapeng, Mokoekoe, Nazareth, Nkokamale, Ntširele, Patiseng, Qobellong, Ralefatla, Sekokong, Sephokong, Terai Hoek, Tlhakoaneng and Tšieng.

References

External links
 Google map of community villages

Populated places in Mokhotlong District